The EFL League Two Player of the Month is an association football award that recognises the player adjudged the best for each month of the season in EFL League Two, the fourth tier of English football. Originally named the Football League Two Player of the Month award, it replaced the Third Division Player of the Month as League Two replaced the Third Division in 2004, and in 2016, when the Football League rebranded itself as the English Football League (EFL), the award was renamed accordingly. From the 2013–14 season, the Football League is sponsored by Sky Bet, so it is known as the Sky Bet League Two Player of the Month award. The awards are designed and manufactured in the UK by bespoke awards company Gaudio Awards.

List of winners

 Each year in the table below is linked to the corresponding football season.

Multiple winners
Up to and including the October 2022 award.
 The table lists all the players who have won more than once.

Awards won by nationality
Up to and including the February 2023 award.

Awards won by club
Up to and including the February 2023 award.

See also
 Football League Two Manager of the Month
 Football League Championship Player of the Month
 Football League One Player of the Month

References

Association football player of the month awards
English Football League trophies and awards
Player of the Month